Temperature Rising is the second English language album by Thai singer Tata Young. It was released in 2006. The album consists of cover songs and original songs. The first single is "El Nin-YO!", from the lyrics of which the album's title comes. ("You got my temperature rising like El Nin-YO!"). Her second single is "Zoom" which was released in September.

"Come Rain Come Shine", the third single, was used in Star World's station promo's from December 2006 to mid-2007. The promo includes footage of Tata Young singing "Come Rain Come Shine" as well as scenes from some of Star World's television shows (Everybody Loves Raymond, American Idol etc.)

Track #7, "Zoom", was covered by Ashley Tisdale on her 2007 debut album Headstrong, under the title as "Don't Touch (The Zoom Song)".

Temperature Rising was the last Tata Young album released on cassette tapes, but in very small numbers produced in a short time until September 2006.

Track listing 

Note:
"Come Rain Come Shine" Samples from "Silly Love Songs" by McCartney and McCartney

References

External links
 Track by Track, in Tata's own words

2006 albums
Tata Young albums